Joshua Randall Pfeiffer (born June 27, 1973) is an American singer, songwriter and music producer.

Early life 
He was born in Sonora, California to parents Gary and Joyce Pfeiffer, and was one of five children growing up.  Josh credits his parents as being two of the most influential people in his musical development.  He attended Summerville High School where he was active in the music program, including the original Jazz@8 Choir. He went on to receive Outstanding Musicianship Awards at the Santa Cruz Jazz Festival, Redding Jazz Festival, and Fullerton Jazz Festival. Pfeiffer received a number of music scholarships after graduating.

Career

American Crooner Act:1 
In 2010, Josh made his debut with American Crooner Act:1, a jazz music album, featuring cover versions of Big Band standards as well as original compositions, Life, Beautiful Girl, California Days, When I'm With You, and Where I Want To Be. The album features the late Tower Of Power founding member and trumpet player Mic Gillette, as well as pianist Kent Gripenstraw.

Brand New Shoes 
In late 2017, Pfeiffer released his single and music video entitled Brand New Shoes. The song was written and co-produced by David Schram, engineered by Adam Munoz and mixed by Grammy Award winner Joe Chiccarelli.

One More Time 
On November 17, 2018, Pfeiffer released the single and music One More Time. It is the artists first release in the country music genre. The collaborative team for One More Time included David Hawkes on drums, Shawn Tubbs on pedal steel, Kevin Jachetta on piano, and co producer David Schram on rhythm guitar, bass, and ukulele.  One More Time  is also one of the last songs recorded and produced at Berkeley, California's legendary Fantasy Studios, before its closing on September 15, 2018. The single reached #57 on the UK Official Singles Sales Top 100 Chart for the week of December 28, 2018.

Dancing Girl (feat. Mic Gillette & Shawn Tubbs) 
On August 1, 2019, Pfeiffer released the single Dancing Girl (feat. Mic Gillette & Shawn Tubbs). The song was written by Pfeiffer and co produced by Pfeiffer and David Schram. The song posthumously features Josh's friend and mentor Mic Gillette, who died in 2016. Gillette, who is best known as a founding member of Tower Of Power, arranged and recorded most of the horn parts prior to his untimely death. The song also features lead guitarist Shawn Tubbs. Additional credits include David Hawkes on drums, Kevin Jachetta on keys, David Schram on bass and rhythm guitar, and Gordon Giedt on Saxophone. The song was engineered and mixed by Adam Munoz and mastered by Ken Lee. Like Pfeiffer's previous release One More Time, Dancing Girl  was one of the last projects recorded at Fantasy Studios in Berkeley, California before the studio closed in late 2018.

Personal life 
He is married to Tara Pfeiffer, and the couple has three children, David, Tamara, and Hannah Pfeiffer. The couple currently resides in Sacramento, California. He is an automobile enthusiast, and a partner with his brother Justin Pfeiffer in the California-based automotive reconditioning company Pro Finish. Josh is an active vegan, and an advocate for a plant-based diet. He made the vegan lifestyle change in June 2017 after seeing the positive impact it had on his wife and daughters.

Discography

Albums 
American Crooner Act: 1 (2010)

Singles 
Life (2017)

Brand New Shoes (2017)

California Days feat. Mic Gillette (2018)

One More Time (2018)

Dancing Girl feat. Mic Gillette & Shawn Tubbs (2019)

Chart history

References

External links 
 Official website

1973 births
Living people
21st-century American singers
21st-century American male singers
American hip hop singers
American male singer-songwriters
American male pop singers
American soul singers
Singer-songwriters from California